The Bahama 30 is an American sailboat that was designed by Bob Finch as a cruiser and first built in 1973.

The Bahama 30 shares the same hull design as the Islander 30 Mk II.

Production
The design was built by Islander Yachts in the United States, from 1973 to 1986, but it is now out of production.

Design
The Bahama 30 is a recreational keelboat, built predominantly of fiberglass, with wood trim. It has a masthead sloop rig, a raked stem, a reverse transom, an internally mounted spade-type rudder controlled by a wheel and a fixed fin keel. It displaces  and carries  of lead ballast.

There was also an optional shoal draft keel.

The design's galley is on the port side, at the foot of the companionway steps. It has a two-burner alcohol-fueled stove and an insulted icebox, which can also be accessed from the cockpit. The head is across the beam and just aft of the bow "V"-berth. It includes a shower. There is a double main cabin berth from the converted settee and a starboard quarter berth. The interior trim is teak, while the cabin sole is teak and holly. The cabin headliner is vinyl. There is a forward hanging locker and a forepeak storage compartment. Ventilation is provided by four opening ports and a forward translucent hatch.

There are genoa tracks, main and jib winches, slab reefing and internal halyards along with a topping lift.

See also
List of sailing boat types

Similar sailboats
Alberg 30
Alberg Odyssey 30
Aloha 30
Annie 30
Bristol 29.9
C&C 30
C&C 30 Redwing
Catalina 30
Catalina 309
CS 30
Grampian 30
Hunter 30
Hunter 30T
Hunter 30-2
Hunter 306
Kirby 30
Leigh 30
Mirage 30
Mirage 30 SX
Nonsuch 30
O'Day 30
Pearson 303
S2 9.2
Seafarer 30
Southern Cross 28
Tanzer 31

References

External links

Keelboats
1970s sailboat type designs
Sailing yachts
Sailboat type designs by Bob Finch
Sailboat types built by Islander Yachts